Río Blanco is a district of the Limón canton, in the Limón province of Costa Rica.

History 
Río Blanco was created on 10 August 1992 by Decreto Ejecutivo 21515-G.

Geography 
Río Blanco has an area of  km² and an elevation of  metres.

Locations
Poblados: Brisas, Brisas de Veragua, Búfalo, Limón 2000, Loma Linda, México, Milla 9, Miravalles, Río Blanco, Río Cedro, Río Madre, Río Quito, Río Victoria, Sandoval, Santa Rita, Victoria

Demographics 

For the 2011 census, Río Blanco had a population of  inhabitants.

Transportation

Road transportation 
The district is covered by the following road routes:
 National Route 32
 National Route 240
 National Route 257

References 

Districts of Limón Province
Populated places in Limón Province